The 2016 Gold Cup was the fourth season of the Gold Cup competition, but the first season that it was known as the Gold Cup, having previously been known as the Community Cup. The tournament was the top competition for non-university rugby union clubs in South Africa, Namibia and Zimbabwe.

While previous editions of the competition were held over the Easter weekend, the 2016 tournament took place later in the year, with the matches in the competition taking place between 10 September and 29 October 2016. Also, the champion clubs from Namibia and Zimbabwe took part in the competition for the first time.

The competition was won by Rustenburg Impala for the second time in three years; they beat False Bay 48–24 in the final played on 29 October 2016.

Competition rules and information

The format of the Gold Cup was the same as the Rugby World Cup. The teams were divided into four pools, each containing five teams. They then played four pool games, playing other teams in their respective pools once. Each team played two home games and two away games.

The winner and runner-up of each pool entered the play-off stage, which consisted of quarter finals, semi-finals and the final. The winner of each pool met the runner-up of a different pool in a quarter final, at the home venue of the pool winner. The winner of each quarter-final progressed to the semi-finals and the semi-final winners to the final, which was held at the home venue of the finalist with the best record in the pool stages.

Qualification

The highest-placed non-university clubs in the 2015 season of each of the fifteen provincial unions' club leagues, as well as defending champions Durbanville-Bellville all qualified for the 2016 Gold Cup competition.

To cater for the switching the tournament from the first half of the year to the second half, all non-university clubs that won their leagues in the 2016 season qualified to a playoff for two additional spots in the 2016 Gold Cup. These play-offs matches were:

Teams

The following teams qualified for the 2016 Gold Cup:

Team listing

Pool Stages

In the draw made in February 2016, the twenty teams were drawn in four pools.

Pool A

The final log of the 2016 Gold Cup Pool A is:

The following matches were played in the 2016 Gold Cup Pool A:

Round one

Round two

Round three

Round four

Round five

Pool B

The final log of the 2016 Gold Cup Pool B is:

The following matches were played in the 2016 Gold Cup Pool B:

Round one

Round two

Round three

Round four

Round five

Pool C

The final log of the 2016 Gold Cup Pool C is:

The following matches were played in the 2016 Gold Cup Pool C:

Round one

Round two

Round three

Round four

Round five

Pool D

The final log of the 2016 Gold Cup Pool D is:

The following matches were played in the 2016 Gold Cup Pool D:

Round one

Round two

Round three

Round four

Round five

Play-offs

Quarter-finals

Semi-finals

Final

Honours

The honour roll for the 2016 Gold Cup was:

Players

Squads

The following squads were named for the 2016 Gold Cup:

Points scorers

The following table contain points scored in the 2016 Gold Cup:

Referees

The following referees officiated matches in the 2016 Gold Cup:

External links

References

2016
2016 in South African rugby union
2016 rugby union tournaments for clubs